These 98 species of sandpipers and allies in the family Scolopacidae are recognized by the International Ornithological Committee (IOC). In addition to the species directly called "sandpiper", the family includes curlews, godwits, stints, snipes, and a few other groups. They are distributed among 15 genera, three of which have only one member. Five species are known to be extinct (marked E) and one which probably is are included.

This list is presented according to the IOC taxonomic sequence and can also be sorted alphabetically by common name and binomial.

References

S
Sandpipers